Rinorea marginata is a species of plant in the Violaceae family. It is endemic to Colombia.

References

marginata
Endemic flora of Colombia
Taxonomy articles created by Polbot

Endangered flora of South America